German submarine U-1103 was a Type VIIC/41 U-boat of Nazi Germany's Kriegsmarine during World War II.

She was ordered on 14 October 1941, and was laid down on 26 May 1943, at Nordseewerke, Emden, as yard number 225. She was launched on 12 October 1943, and commissioned under the command of Kapitänleutnant Hans Bungards on 8 January 1944.

Design
German Type VIIC/41 submarines were preceded by the heavier Type VIIC submarines. U-1103 had a displacement of  when at the surface and  while submerged. She had two shafts and two  propellers.

U-1103 was fitted with five  torpedo tubes (four fitted at the bow and one at the stern), fourteen torpedoes or 26 TMA or TMB Naval mines, one  SK C/35 naval gun, (220 rounds), one  Flak M42 and two  C/30 anti-aircraft guns. The boat had a complement of between forty-four and fifty-two.

Service history
On 5 May 1945, U-1103 surrendered at Cuxhaven, Germany and was later transferred from Wilhelmshaven to Loch Ryan, Scotland. Of the 156 U-boats that eventually surrendered to the Allied forces at the end of the war, U-1103 was one of 116 selected to take part in Operation Deadlight. U-1103 was towed out and sank on 30 December 1945, by naval gunfire.

See also
 Battle of the Atlantic

References

Bibliography

German Type VIIC/41 submarines
U-boats commissioned in 1944
World War II submarines of Germany
1944 ships
Ships built in Emden
Maritime incidents in December 1945
World War II shipwrecks in the Atlantic Ocean
Operation Deadlight